is a 2012 Japanese television drama series. Based on the novel Yumechigai by Riku Onda, this television series stars actress Keiko Kitagawa, singer Gackt, and also child actress Manatsu Kimura. A movie was announced for 2014.

This television series was broadcast in Japan from October 13, 2012, to December 22, 2012, as part of Nippon Television's Saturday Dramas time slot, which airs every Saturday from 9 pm to 9:54 pm. In addition, it was simulcast on the streaming service Crunchyroll in the U.S., Canada, United Kingdom, Ireland, South Africa, Australia, and New Zealand.

Plot

Ayami is a beautiful and intelligent teacher who is popular with both her students and colleagues alike. However, she has a darker side- she does not genuinely feel for others nor does she believe in love or trust. One day, however, Yuiko, a girl whose dreams are able to predict terrible events of the future, transfers into Ayami's class after dreaming that Ayami is a saviour of the world. Ayami reluctantly gets dragged into helping Yuiko change the terrible fate of the people around them.

Cast

 Keiko Kitagawa as Ayami Mutoi
Child actress Hirasawa Kokoro plays the role of young Ayami.
 Manatsu Kimura as Yuiko Koto
 Yūka as Hirashima Kotoha
 Fumiyo Kohinata as Bannosuke Koto
 Gackt as Takashi Shiki/Yumeoji
 Masato Wada as Mineki Yamasato

Teachers

 Mari Hamada as Satoko Kaibara
 Keisuke Okada as Yuichi Mugiyama
 Yosuke Kawamura as Katsuyuki Inamoto
 Kenji Anan as Shinya Nakagomi
 Midoriko Kimura as Tatsuko Amasawa

Production

My Little Nightmare was announced on August 17, 2012. It was announced that actress Keiko Kitagawa would star as the main lead of this drama series, making this her first role as a teacher. Child actress Manatsu Kimura was selected from a group of more than 500 hopefuls who auditioned for this drama series.

Episodes

Theme song

This single was produced by Tomoyasu Hotei.

References

External links 

 My Little Nightmare at Nippon TV  
  
 

2012 Japanese television series debuts
Nippon TV dramas
Japanese drama television series
2012 Japanese television series endings
Television shows based on Japanese novels
Television shows about nightmares
Japanese supernatural television series